Innuendo was a Malaysian boy band and one of Malaysia's premier R&B group, best known for their cover of Carefree's evergreen ballad, "Belaian Jiwa", and their 70s style single, "Only Dancin'".

Career
Innuendo was formed in 1992 when a love for R&B and Soul music brought Reymee bin Mohamed Hussein (born on November 15, 1976), Shamshul Azhar bin Nazeer, and Ahmad Tajuddin Bin Mohamed Tahir (born on August 27, 1974) and Saiful Amir bin Abdul Wahab (born on November 1, 1971) together. As a multi award-winning group which contributed in re-introduction of boy-band scenes locally, Innuendo also successfully re-introduced a cappella tunes to Malaysian audiences after decades of being unheard on mainstream media. After the departure of the fourth member, Sam, on August 20, 2002, this local harmony quartet-turned-trio continued with a new album, BrandNuEndo, and performed at award shows including AIM 2002 (Anugerah Industri Musik 2002) where they also picked up an award, and venues around the country including at Planet Hollywood every Sunday in August 2002.

Discography
 Innuendo
 Innuendo Enhanced
 Brandnuendo

References

Malaysian musical groups
Musical groups established in 1992
Musical groups disestablished in 2005
Musical quartets
Musical trios